Lucas Williamson (born January 28, 1999) is an American professional basketball player for the Ontario Clippers of the NBA G League. He played college basketball for the Loyola Ramblers.

High school career
Williamson played basketball for Whitney M. Young Magnet High School in Chicago, Illinois. In his first season, he was the only freshman on the team and won the Class 4A state title alongside Jahlil Okafor. As a senior, Williamson averaged 17.5 points, 4.8 rebounds and 2.1 assists per game, leading his team to another Class 4A state title. He committed to playing college basketball for Loyola (Illinois) over offers from UIC and Northern Illinois.

College career
As a freshman at Loyola, Williamson averaged 4.7 points and 2.2 rebounds per game, earning Missouri Valley Conference (MVC) All-Freshman and All-Bench Team honors. He helped 11th-seeded Loyola reach the Final Four of the 2018 NCAA tournament. Williamson missed about half of his sophomore season with two hand injuries. He averaged 8.8 points and 5.9 rebounds per game. As a junior, he averaged nine points and 3.3 rebounds per game and was an MVC All-Defensive Team selection. In his senior season, Williamson earned Second Team All-MVC honors and was named MVC Defensive Player of the Year. He helped Loyola reach the Sweet 16 of the NCAA Tournament, averaging 8.8 points and 3.9 rebounds per game while shooting 35.9 percent from three-point range. Following the season, Williamson took advantage of the extra season of eligibility granted by the NCAA due to the COVID-19 pandemic. He earned First Team All-MVC honors and was named MVC Defensive Player of the Year.

Professional career

Ontario Clippers (2022–present)
On June 24, 2022, Williamson signed an Exhibit 10 contract with the Los Angeles Clippers. On October 4, 2022, Williamson (along with Juwan Morgan and Michael Devoe) was waived by the Clippers.

On October 24, 2022, Williamson joined the Ontario Clippers training camp roster.

Career statistics

College

|-
| style="text-align:left;"| 2017–18
| style="text-align:left;"| Loyola
| 38 || 5 || 20.2 || .435 || .415 || .704 || 2.2 || 1.0 || .8 || .3 || 4.7
|-
| style="text-align:left;"| 2018–19
| style="text-align:left;"| Loyola
| 16 || 15 || 29.9 || .480 || .413 || .600 || 5.9 || 1.7 || 1.6 || .3 || 8.8
|-
| style="text-align:left;"| 2019–20
| style="text-align:left;"| Loyola
| 32 || 32 || 30.2 || .448 || .333 || .692 || 3.3 || 1.7 || 1.5 || .3 || 9.0
|-
| style="text-align:left;"| 2020–21
| style="text-align:left;"| Loyola
| 31 || 31 || 28.0 || .435 || .359 || .778 || 3.9 || 2.1 || 1.4 || .2 || 8.8
|-
| style="text-align:left;"| 2021–22
| style="text-align:left;"| Loyola
| 33 || 33 || 32.0 || .442 || .390 || .728 || 5.0 || 3.1 || 1.4 || .3 || 13.7
|- class="sortbottom"
| style="text-align:center;" colspan="2"| Career
| 150 || 116 || 27.6 || .445 || .377 || .713 || 3.8 || 1.9 || 1.3 || .3 || 8.9

Personal life
Williamson served as the narrator and co-writer for The Loyola Project, a 2022 documentary film that details Loyola's 1963 men's basketball team and their journey in breaking down racial barriers en-route to winning a national championship.

References

External links
Loyola Ramblers bio

1999 births
Living people
American men's basketball players
Basketball players from Chicago
Loyola Ramblers men's basketball players
Shooting guards
Whitney M. Young Magnet High School alumni